Geologryggen is a mountain ridge in Oscar II Land at Spitsbergen, Svalbard. The ridge has a length of about four kilometers, and is located between Kjerulfbreen and Esmarkbreen. Geologryggen is included in the Nordre Isfjorden National Park.

References

Mountains of Spitsbergen